Benjamin Hadžić (born 4 March 1999) is a German-born Bosnian footballer who plays as a forward for Schweinfurt 05.

Club career
Hadžić joined the youth sector of Bayern Munich in 2013 from 1. FC Nürnberg. For the 2017/18 season he moved to VfB Stuttgart. In June 2018 he completed a trial with the Austrian Football Bundesliga club SCR Altach, but was not signed.

In August 2018 he moved to Hannover 96, where he was registered for the clubs reserve team. Hadžić made his professional debut for Hannover 96 in the Bundesliga on 19 December 2018, coming on as a substitute in the 80th minute for Hendrik Weydandt in the 1–1 away draw against SC Freiburg. By the end of the season he made three appearances in the Bundesliga and 25 for the Regionalliga team.

In the 2019–20 season he was only used for the reserve team and therefore, he moved to the Austrian second division club Austria Klagenfurt in February 2020, with whom he received a contract that ran until June 2022.

International career
Hadžić was included in Bosnia and Herzegovina's squad for the 2016 UEFA European Under-17 Championship in Azerbaijan. He scored twice in their third match against Ukraine, which finished as a 2–1 win. However, Bosnia and Herzegovina were eliminated in the group stage of the tournament.

References

External links
 
 Profile at DFB.de
 Profile at kicker.de

1999 births
Living people
People from Wesel (district)
Sportspeople from Düsseldorf (region)
Footballers from North Rhine-Westphalia
German people of Bosnia and Herzegovina descent
Citizens of Bosnia and Herzegovina through descent
Association football forwards
Bosnia and Herzegovina footballers
Bosnia and Herzegovina youth international footballers
Bosnia and Herzegovina under-21 international footballers
German footballers
Hannover 96 II players
Hannover 96 players
SK Austria Klagenfurt players
1. FC Schweinfurt 05 players
Bundesliga players
Regionalliga players
2. Liga (Austria) players
Bosnia and Herzegovina expatriate footballers
Expatriate footballers in Austria
Bosnia and Herzegovina expatriate sportspeople in Austria